PS-94 Korangi Karachi-III is a constituency of the Provincial Assembly of Sindh.

General elections 2013

General elections 2008

See also
 PS-93 Korangi Karachi-II
 PS-95 Korangi Karachi-IV

References

External links
 Election commission Pakistan's official website
 Awazoday.com check result
 Official Website of Government of Sindh

Constituencies of Sindh